Myrcia neokiaerskovii is a species of plant in the family Myrtaceae. It is found in Puerto Rico and the British Virgin Islands. Its natural habitat is subtropical or tropical dry forests. It is threatened by habitat loss.

References

neokiaerskovii
Critically endangered plants
Taxonomy articles created by Polbot